Nathan Thorley (born 18 April 1993) is former Welsh professional boxer who challenged for the Commonwealth cruiserweight title in August 2020. As an amateur he competed for Wales in the light-heavyweight category at the 2014 Commonwealth Games where he won a bronze medal.

He turned professional in 2015, winning the Welsh light-heavyweight title two years later by defeating Jermaine Asare.

Career

Amateur
Born in Cardiff, Thorley took up boxing as a child between the age of nine or ten after joining a boxing gym managed by Pat Thomas in the Fairwater area. He later fought at St. Joseph's and Splott Amateur Boxing Club. Thorley was chosen to represent Wales at the 2014 Commonwealth Games in Glasgow. He had initially not been selected for the squad before replacing Jamie Evans who pulled out of the squad. He won a bronze medal at the games after suffering a defeat to Kennedy St-Pierre in the semi-finals when his corner threw in the towel in the third round.

As an amateur, Thorley recorded 70 victories.

Professional
Thorley turned professional in 2015, winning his debut bout against Polish fighter Krystian Nadolski by KO. Having won his first eight bouts as a professional, Thorley gained a title bout for the Welsh Light-heavyweight title against fellow Commonwealth bronze medalist Jermaine Asare at Merthyr Leisure Centre. Thorley knocked Adare down in the second round with a right hand which prompted the referee to end the bout, awarding Thorley a TKO victory.

On August 8th 2020 Thorley challenged Chris Billam Smith for the British cruiserweight title.

References

External links

1993 births
Living people
Commonwealth Games bronze medallists for Wales
Boxers at the 2014 Commonwealth Games
Welsh male boxers
Commonwealth Games medallists in boxing
Boxers from Cardiff
Light-heavyweight boxers
Medallists at the 2014 Commonwealth Games